Fifth Dimension or fifth dimension may refer to:

 Five-dimensional space, a mathematical concept or construct
 The 5th Dimension, a pop music vocal group debuting in the 1960s
 5th Dimension (album), a 2013 album by Momoiro Clover Z
 Fifth Dimension (album), a 1966 album by the Byrds
 "5D (Fifth Dimension)", a 1966 song by the Byrds
 Fifth Dimension, a program in the Radio Tales series for National Public Radio
 The 5th Dimension, the fictional home dimension of DC Comics villain Mister Mxyzptlk
 The 5th Dimension (ride), an amusement park ride

See also
 Dimension 5  (disambiguation)
 5D (disambiguation)
 Fourth dimension in literature, discusses dimensions 4 and up